Olga Juha (born 22 March 1962) is a retired Hungarian high jumper. Her personal best jump was 1.97 metres, achieved in August 1983 in London. She became Hungarian champion in 1984 and 1987.

Achievements

References

1962 births
Living people
Hungarian female high jumpers